Haobam Singh (born 17 February 2003) is an Indian professional footballer who plays as a midfielder for East Bengal in the Indian Super League.

Career
Born in Manipur, Haobam Singh began his career with East Bengal in the Indian Super League. He made his professional debut for Indian Super league side on 20 December 2020 against Kerala Blasters. He started and played 70 minutes as East Bengal drew the match 1–1.

Statistics

See also 

 Surchandra Singh
Rohen Singh

References

External links 

 Indian Super League profile
 Soccerway profile

East Bengal Club players
Living people
Footballers from Manipur
Indian Super League players
Association football midfielders
Indian footballers
2003 births